The 2003 Monaco Grand Prix (formally the Grand Prix de Monaco 2003) was a Formula One motor race held on 1 June 2003 at the Circuit de Monaco. It was the seventh race of the 2003 Formula One World Championship. The 78-lap race was won by Colombian driver Juan Pablo Montoya, driving a Williams-BMW, with Finn Kimi Räikkönen second in a McLaren-Mercedes and German Michael Schumacher third in a Ferrari.

There were no recorded on-track overtakes during this race, one of the very few occasions in Formula One history where this has occurred. The other three races since 1981 not to feature any on-track overtakes were the controversial 2005 United States Grand Prix, the 2009 European Grand Prix and the 2021 Belgian Grand Prix.

Background
The Grand Prix was contested by 20 drivers, in ten teams of two. The teams, also known as constructors, were Ferrari, Williams, McLaren, Renault, Sauber, Jordan, Jaguar, BAR, Minardi and Toyota.

Before the race, McLaren driver Kimi Räikkönen led the Drivers' Championship with 40 points; Ferrari driver Michael Schumacher was second on 38 points. Behind them in the Drivers' Championship, Rubens Barrichello was third on 26 points in the other Ferrari, with Fernando Alonso and David Coulthard on 25 and 23 points respectively. In the Constructors' Championship, Ferrari were leading with 64 points and McLaren were second on 63 points, with Renault third on 35 points.

Practice
Four practice sessions were held before the Sunday race—Two on Thursday, and two on Saturday. The Thursday morning and afternoon sessions each lasted an hour. The third and final practice sessions were held on Saturday morning and lasted 45 minutes. Jaguar driver Mark Webber set the fastest time in the first session, posting a lap of 1:16.373, one-tenth of a second quicker than Jenson Button and Coulthard, in second and third places respectively. The Renault cars were fourth and fifth fastest; Alonso ahead of Jarno Trulli, with Michael Schumacher rounding out the top six.

Qualifying
The qualifying session was run as a one-lap session and took place on Thursday and Saturday afternoon. The cars were run one at a time; the Thursday running order was determined with the Championship leading heading out first. The Saturday running order was determined by times set in Friday afternoon qualifying with the fastest heading out last and the slowest running first. The lap times from the Thursday afternoon session did not determine the grid order.

Jenson Button suffered a heavy crash during Saturday morning practice and his resulting injuries meant that he took no further part in the weekend.

Qualifying classification

Race

Race classification

Championship standings after the race 

Drivers' Championship standings

Constructors' Championship standings

Note: Only the top five positions are included for both sets of standings.

See also 
 2003 Monaco F3000 round

References

Monaco Grand Prix
Monaco Grand Prix
Grand Prix
Monaco Grand Prix